John Gilbert (7 March 1816 – 22 November 1887) was an English first-class cricketer active 1843–48 who played for Nottinghamshire. He was born and died in Mansfield.

References

1816 births
1887 deaths
English cricketers
Nottinghamshire cricketers
Players of Nottinghamshire cricketers